Espírito Santo Futebol Clube, commonly known as Espírito Santo, is a Brazilian football club based in Espírito Santo state.

They club is currently ranked sixth among Espírito Santo teams in CBF's national club ranking, at 184th place overall.

History
The club was founded on October 19, 2007. They finished in the second position in the Campeonato Capixaba Second Level in 2009, losing the competition to Vitória.

Honours
 Copa Espírito Santo: 1
2015

 Campeonato Capixaba Second Level: 1
2015

References

Association football clubs established in 2007
Football clubs in Espírito Santo
2007 establishments in Brazil